Eom Hyo-won (born 12 December 1986) is a South Korean handball player. He was born in Seoul. He competed for the South Korean national team at the 2012 Summer Olympics in London.

References

1986 births
Living people
South Korean male handball players
Olympic handball players of South Korea
Handball players at the 2012 Summer Olympics
Asian Games medalists in handball
Handball players at the 2014 Asian Games
Asian Games silver medalists for South Korea
Medalists at the 2014 Asian Games
21st-century South Korean people